The 1977–78 FA Trophy was the ninth season of the FA Trophy.

Preliminary round

Ties

Replays

2nd replays

First qualifying round

Ties

Replays

Second qualifying round

Ties

Replays

Third qualifying round

Ties

Replays

1st round
The teams that given byes to this round are Scarborough, Workington, Matlock Town, Morecambe, Stafford Rangers, Weymouth, Wigan Athletic, Bedford Town, Kettering Town, Boston United, Yeovil Town, Atherstone Town, Runcorn, Lancaster City, Enfield, Wycombe Wanderers, Dagenham, Tooting & Mitcham United, Leatherhead, Willington, Spennymoor United, Falmouth Town, Altrincham, Minehead, Nuneaton Borough, Northwich Victoria, Bangor City, Hendon, Slough Town, Winsford United, Consett and Crook Town.

Ties

Replays

2nd replays

2nd round

Ties

Replays

2nd replays

3rd round

Ties

Replays

4th round

Ties

Replays

Semi finals

First leg

Second leg

Final

References

General
 Football Club History Database: FA Trophy 1977-78

Specific

1977–78 domestic association football cups
League
1977-78